James Worrall,  (June 23, 1914 – October 9, 2011) was a Canadian lawyer, Olympic track and field athlete, and sports administrator.

Born in Bury, Lancashire, England, Worrall emigrated to Montreal, Quebec in 1922.

He received a Bachelor of Science degree from McGill University in 1935, then received his law degree from Osgoode Hall Law School in Toronto, Ontario, going on to practice law in Toronto.

A track and field athlete, Worrall was the Canadian team flag bearer at the 1936 Summer Olympics opening ceremonies in Berlin, Germany, competing in both hurdling events.

In the 110 metre hurdles event as well as in the 400 metre hurdles competition he was eliminated in the first round.

Previously, at the 1934 British Empire Games held in London, he won the silver medal in the 120 yards hurdles contest. In the quarter mile hurdles event (440 yards) he finished fourth.

Following his competitive retirement, he moved into sports administration within the Olympic movement. From 1964 to 1968, Worrall was the president of the Canadian Olympic Committee and he rose to be a member of the International Olympic Committee – a position he held from 1967 to 1989.

In 1989, he was made an Honorary Member of the International Olympic Committee. Worrall was a member of the Board of Directors of the organizing committees for the 1976 Summer Olympics and the 1988 Winter Olympics.

In 1976, Worrall was made an Officer of the Order of Canada.

In 1987, he was inducted into Canada's Sports Hall of Fame. In 1991, he was inducted into the Olympic Hall of Fame. In 1998, he was inducted to the McGill University Sports Hall of Fame.

In July 2009 Worrall was noted as Canada's second oldest living Olympian, and he became the oldest upon the death of Marjory Saunders in November 2010.

References

External links
 Death of IOC Honorary Member James Worrall, website of the IOC, 10 October 2011

1914 births
2011 deaths
Canadian male hurdlers
Olympic track and field athletes of Canada
Athletes (track and field) at the 1936 Summer Olympics
Athletes (track and field) at the 1934 British Empire Games
Commonwealth Games silver medallists for Canada
Commonwealth Games medallists in athletics
McGill University alumni
Officers of the Order of Canada
Anglophone Quebec people
Athletes from Montreal
Sportspeople from Bury, Greater Manchester
British emigrants to Canada
Recipients of the Olympic Order
International Olympic Committee members
Osgoode Hall Law School alumni
Lawyers in Ontario
Presidents of the Canadian Olympic Committee
Medallists at the 1934 British Empire Games